The Veillard House is a historic home in St. Petersburg, Florida. It is located at 262 North 4th Avenue. On October 29, 1982, it was added to the U.S. National Register of Historic Places.

References

External links
 Pinellas County listings at National Register of Historic Places
 Pinellas County listings at Florida's Office of Cultural and Historical Programs

Houses on the National Register of Historic Places in Florida
National Register of Historic Places in Pinellas County, Florida
Houses in St. Petersburg, Florida